Eduardo Varela Sicangco is a stage designer and illustrator for Broadway, opera, and Hollywood film. His work is widely recognized and has been included in the Lynn Pecktal book Costume Design: Techniques of Modern Masters.

Career
Eduardo Varela Sicangco was born in Bacolod, Negros Occidental. He was a student of National Artist Salvador Bernal at the Ateneo de Manila University. He later became Bernal’s protégé at the Cultural Center of the Philippines where Sicangco designed Le Carnaval for Ballet Philippines. Upon finishing an MFA in stage design at New York University, Tisch School of the Arts, he was given the J.S. Seidman Award for Excellence in Design. Sicangco was a Master Teacher of Design at NYU until 2004. He has thirty-two years of scenographic work in American theaters and various international design.

References

External links
 
 

Filipino illustrators
People from Bacolod
Artists from Negros Occidental
Year of birth missing (living people)
Living people
New York University alumni
Ateneo de Manila University alumni
American costume designers
American scenic designers